Club Deportivo Marte Soyapango is a Salvadoran professional football club.

History
Marte Soyapango purchased C.D. Chagüite spot in the Segunda División Salvadorean in 2019.

Honours

Domestic honours
 Segunda División Salvadorean and predecessors 
 Champions (2) : 1987, 1999
 Tercera División Salvadorean and predecessors 
 Champions:(1) :
 Liga ADFAS and predecessors 
 Champions:(1) :2017

Stadium
 Estadio Jorgito Meléndez,;  (2005–2018)
 Estadio España de Soyapango, (2019-Present)
 Estadio Cuscatlán; San Salvador (2014) final series home ground

Notable Players
  Jorge "El Conejo" Liévano

List of coaches

  Piolín Melgar
  Carlos "Chicharrón" Aguilar (1996-May 1996)
  Carlos "Chicharrón" Aguilar (1999-2000)
  Ricardo Herrera (90s)
  Manuel de Jesús Rivas (2007)
  Manuel Aguilar (2007)
  Guillermo Rivera (2008)
  Ricardo "La Culebra" García (2009)
  Fausto Omar Vásquez (2010)
 Geovanni Portillo
  Luis Ángel León (2011)
  Edson Flores (2011)
  Guillermo Rivera (2011–2012)
 Carlos Antonio Meléndez (2012)
 Raúl Toro Basáez (2013)
 Miguel Angel Soriano (2013 – August 2013)
 Jorge Calles (September 2013 – June 2014)
 Edgar Henríquez Kiko (July 2014 – July 2015)
 Juan Ramón Paredes (July 2015 – February 2016)
 Rubén Alonso (February 2016 – July 2016)
 William Osorio (July 2019 - February 2020)
 Juan Ramón Paredes (March 2020-)
 Rudy Cecilios ( - November 2020)
 Edson Flores (November 2020 -July 2021)
 Mauricio Alfaro (July 2021-Present)

References

External links
 Club Deportivo Marte Soyapango :: Estadísticas :: Títulos :: Títulos :: Historia :: Goles :: Próximos Partidos :: Resultados :: Noticias :: Vídeos :: Fotos :: Plantilla :: ceroacero.es

Football clubs in El Salvador
San Salvador Department